The Winnipeg Film Group (WFG) is an artist-run film education, production, distribution, and exhibition centre in Winnipeg, Manitoba, committed to promoting the art of Canadian cinema, especially independent cinema. 

While specializing in short films, WFG's collection ranges from works one-second shorts to full-length features, with films spanning various genres including narrative drama and comedy, animation, documentary and experimental, as well as hybrids of genres.

As a non-profit organization, its operations are funded by the Canada Council for the Arts, Manitoba Arts Council, and Winnipeg Arts Council.

History
The Winnipeg Film Group was established in 1974 as a product of the annual Canadian Film Symposium at the University of Manitoba, which was dedicated to celebrating and screening independent Canadian cinema.

During the Symposium, several local independent filmmakers came together to approach the government to help fund the creation of the Winnipeg Film Group, aiming to pool resources towards making independent films. By the end of the Symposium, all filmmakers in attendance—including Denys Arcand, Donald Shebib, and Colin Low—signed what they called the "Winnipeg Manifesto," which began, "We, the undersigned filmmakers, wish to voice our belief that the present system of film production / distribution / exhibition works to the extreme disadvantage of the Canadian filmmaker."

The Winnipeg Film Group was officially incorporated on 27 December 1974. Soon after, in 1976, WFG collaboratively produced its first completed film, Rabbit Pie. In 1980, You Laugh Like a Duck marked the first co-production between WFG and the Atlantic Filmmakers Cooperative. The following year, WFG began distributing independent films, and in the fall of 1982, WFG began its cinematheque/revival house program (called Cinematheque), screening at the National Film Board’s Cinema Main. In 1984, The Three Worlds of Nick became the first WFG film to be screened at Toronto Festival of Festivals (now the Toronto International Film Festival).

In 1986, WFG, in its entirety (including Cinematheque), moved into its current location in the Artspace Building at 100 Arthur Street, across the street from Winnipeg's Old Market Square. In 1989, three WFG members were nominated for Genie Awards: Ed Ackerman for Primiti Too Taa, Lorne Bailey for The Milkman Cometh, and Guy Maddin for Tales From The Gimli Hospital.

In 1993, Watershed Media Trust in Bristol, England, hosted an 8-city, 4-film tour of work from the Winnipeg Film Group. WFG also partnered with Video Pool to establish "RE:VISIONS – The Winnipeg Women’s Film and Video Festival". Also that year, the WFG earned a lifetime achievement award from the Canadian Film and Television Producers Association. In 1999, Gordon Wilding's Rapture (1997) became the first WFG-supported film to be part of the Cannes Film Festival.

In 2015, WFG launched the Women’s Film & Video Network (now Womxn’s Film & Video Network), purposed to supporting the film and video work of women in Manitoba. The network would become arms-length and member-led in 2019, changing its name to Womxn’s Film and Video Network.

Select filmography 
Early films of the Winnipeg Film Group include:

 1976. Rabbit Pie, directed by Allan Kroeker
 1979. Day Dream, directed by Alan Pakarnyk
 1980. You Laugh Like a Duck, directed by Leon Johnson
 1984. The Three Worlds of Nick, directed by John Paizs — screened at Toronto Festival of Festivals (now the Toronto International Film Festival, or TIFF)
 1985. Crime Wave, directed by John Paizs — won Manitoba Motion Picture Industry Association’s Blizzard Award for Best Film of the Decade in 1997
 1986. Downtime, directed by Greg Hanec — screened at the Berlin International Film Festival
 1988. Tales from The Gimli Hospital, directed by Guy Maddin — Maddin was nominated for a Genie Award
 1990. Archangel, directed by Guy Maddin — voted Best Experimental Film by the U.S. National Society of Film Critics in 1991
 1992. Dog Stories, directed by Shereen Jerrett — premiered at the Sydney International Film Festival
 1993. Taken for a Ride, directed by Dirk Schwipper — Schwipper, from Stuttgart, became WFG’s first German intern
 1995. Odilon Redon, directed by Guy Maddin — received the NFB John Spotton Award at TIFF
 1996. Soft Like Me, directed by Jeff Erbach — screened at the TIFF; purchased in 1998 by Canal+ for European broadcast
 1997. Rapture, directed by Gordon Wilding — purchased by Canal+ in 1999 for broadcast in France; became the first WFG-supported film to be part of the Cannes Film Festival 
 2000. The Heart of the World, directed by Guy Maddin and commissioned by TIFF — named the 2001 Best Experimental Film by critics on two continents.
 2001. Inertia, directed by Sean Garrity and produced by Brendon Sawatzky — named the 2001 Best Canadian First Feature Film at TIFF
 2001. FILM (dzama), directed by Deco Dawson — named the 2001 Best Short at TIFF

Operations
Winnipeg Film Group provides training, funding, and equipment rentals to independent filmmakers. In terms of distribution, it makes Canadian films available to local, national, and international film festivals, broadcasters, other film co-ops, cinemas, and a variety of other presenting organizations.

WFG's first film, Rabbit Pie, was made in 1976 and was collaboratively produced. Directed by Allan Kroeker, it is a pastiche of silent film tropes involving a plot wherein infant rabbits are eaten at a restaurant.

The WFG is governed by a board of directors, which maintains the WFG’s bylaws and supports WFG's mandate, including by directly supporting private-sector fundraising. As the WFG is an artist-run organization, its board must mainly include practicing filmmakers and video artists.

As a non-profit organization, WFG operations are funded by the Canada Council for the Arts, Manitoba Arts Council, and Winnipeg Arts Council. Project funders include Manitoba Film & Music, The Winnipeg Foundation, the Government of Manitoba, and Winnipeg School Division, in addition to individual project funders. Ongoing sponsors include William F. White International, On Screen Manitoba, and Film Training Manitoba.

Cinematheque 
Winnipeg Cinematheque, as the professional presentation department of the Winnipeg Film Group, is a cinematheque theatre that screens both Canadian and world cinema. Operated on the first floor of the historic Artspace building in Winnipeg's Exchange District, it has one screen and plays two evening shows on weekdays, and matinées on the weekends.

The focus is on Canadian films, particularly the cinema of Manitoba, but there are also special screenings for international independent films, children's films, and classic films; Cinematheque also produces the annual Gimme Some Truth Documentary Festival.

Members
WFG is notable for having many past staff and members attain prominent positions in the Canadian media industry. Honorary members are appointed for their "exceptional achievement as a Manitoba filmmaker or for their extraordinary contribution to the development of the Winnipeg Film Group as an organization."

Honorary members of the WFG include:

 Norma Bailey
Dave Barber
Richard Condie
 Larry Desrochers
Michael Drabot
Greg Hanec
Shereen Jerrett
Merit Jensen Carr
John Kozak
Guy Maddin
Solomon Nagler
Winston Washington Moxam
John Paizs
Jeff Peeler
Len Pendergast

Other artists/members of WFG include:

 Atelier National du Manitoba
 Sara Angelucci
 Kiarash Anvari
 Shane Belcourt
 Warren Cariou
 Shelagh Carter
 Ervin Chartrand
 David Demchuk
 Shawna Dempsey
 Kevin Doherty
 Danishka Esterhazy
 Erica Eyres
 Darcy Fehr
 Sadaf Foroughi

Dave Barber has been the Cinematheque programmer at the Winnipeg Film Group since the summer of 1982. He has won several awards for his efforts including the Making A Difference Award for “Extraordinary Contribution” to the Arts by the Winnipeg Arts Council (2007), the first-ever awarded Individual Award for “Outstanding Award of the Arts" by the Manitoba Foundation for the Arts, and the Queen Elizabeth II Diamond Jubilee Award by the Governor-General of Canada in April of 2013.

References

External links
Official site

Guy Maddin and the Winnipeg Film Group — CBC Archives

Culture of Winnipeg
Cinema of Manitoba
Film organizations in Canada
Organizations established in 1974
Organizations based in Winnipeg
Filmmaker cooperatives
Media cooperatives in Canada